The Birth of New Zealand is a 1922 New Zealand film which depicts key events in New Zealand history. Directed by Harrington Reynolds who also starred, other New Zealand pioneer filmmakers Ted Coubray and possibly Rudall Hayward were also involved. Episodes depicted include ancient Maori wars, Captain Cook's landing and the signing of the Treaty of Waitangi.

Only fragments (154 feet) of the film remain.; this sequence may have been used in the 1930 film The Romance of Maoriland.

Cast 
Stella Southern as Dorothy 
Norman French as Tom Campbell 
Harrington Reynolds as Con O'Hara 
George Kingsland as Septimus
Maisie Carter as Mrs Campbell

References

External links
The Birth of New Zealand at NZ Museums

1922 in New Zealand
1922 films
1920s New Zealand films
New Zealand documentary films
New Zealand silent films
Films set in New Zealand
New Zealand historical films